Calling, or  in Japan, is a survival horror video game developed by Hudson Soft exclusively for the Wii console. The game was released in Japan on November 19, 2009, in North America on March 9, 2010, and in Europe on March 19, 2010.

Gameplay
From a first-person perspective, players explore the Mnemonic Abyss' haunted locations; including a doll-filled house, Shosei High School, an internet café, a hospital, a bedroom, and a hair salon. Players can use the Wii Remote's pointer function to interact with objects and move around. The controller also acts as a mobile phone through which ghosts speak to the player character via the speaker. The player can also use the phone to warp to different locations, as well as take pictures and record ghostly voices.

The ghosts confront the player in featured "fight events", where the player must fend them off via swinging the Wii Remote and following button commands.

Plot
Rin Kagura, Shin Suzutani, Chiyo Kishibe, and Makoto Shirae visit "The Black Page", a website featuring only a counter that is said to show the number of people who have died after visiting the website. Rin is drawn there because six years ago she promised Kureneko, a little girl in a hospital, over an online chatroom that she would visit her. After going on The Black Page and entering a chatroom Rin, Shin, Chiyo, and Makoto are drawn into a Purgatory void that lies between life and death; said void manifests memories of the dead and is known as the "Mnemonic Abyss". Using their mobile phones, which can be used as teleporters, the group must try to escape.

Shin is the first person to end up in the Abyss, waking up in the home of a man who's obsessed with doll-making. After later finding Chiyo unconscious on the floor along with several of the doll maker's creations, which are alive, he flees back to where he began. There, the ghost of a little girl holding a black cat doll suddenly appears, attacking him.

Rin is next to enter the Abyss, finding herself in a school after having a dream she hasn't had for a long time. Shin soon runs in, hiding from a ghost. Following a separate ghost, Rin runs into Makoto, who explains the connection between the Abyss and the Black Page, as well as how people who lose hope become spirits, causing him to worry about Shin's condition. As Rin tries to leave, the door closes shut and the previous ghost girl holding a cat doll appears, saying "just you stay here forever with me". The ghost grabs Rin but lets go, calling her a liar before disappearing.

Rin tells Shin that they can use their phones to teleport to another, but that he can't phone himself. Before telling Shin that he'll die if he tries to phone himself, Shin suffers a stroke and vanishes. Before she can retrieve Shin's phone, a ghost appears and takes it. Then, Rin learns about the Black Page and sees a phone number. Using the number to teleport, Rin lands in what appears to be a room full of dolls; the same room where Makoto was. Here she meets Chiyo, an elderly woman who has no idea how she got there. Rin hears a phone ringing, telling Chiyo to stay there until she returns. Chiyo sees a ghost of a mailman, following it into a void which leads to the same hospital she was meant to be staying at before finding the Black Page. Rin comes back, finding a note in Chiyo's place, with only a phone number on it.

Dialing the number, Rin teleports to what looks like a 2-story house, wandering around until she finds another number. Eventually, Makoto contacts Rin, telling her that she can contact ghosts with her phone. She talks to Kuroneko to tell the ghost that she didn't break their promise and had been in an accident, with their hospital beds being right next to each other. Rin explains that she will soon be a part of this world and they could be friends again. In response, the ghost walks away to the third floor and Rin follows. Once there, Kuroneko tries to jump out of a window and Rin attempts to stop her by grabbing her wrist; falling through her ghostly form and hitting the ground, immediately dying. Closely following is Kuroneko jumping face-first, with a snapping sound indicating her death.

Chiyo wakes from the nightmare in a hospital, surrounded by her family. Then time rewinds itself to show Rin arriving at the hospital, once again rewinding to show Makato. He wakes up in what looks like an otaku's room, located in a barber shop. At school he meets his deceased partner, Sadao. Sadao kills Makato, deciding that they can be "partners" again. Meanwhile, Rin meets Kuroneko for the second time. She profusely apologizes while running after Kuroneko, the previous scene where the two girls fall to their deaths being reenacted. Just before Kuroneko jumps we see what the hospitals nurse did to them both, and Rin hugs Kuroneko as they both fall.

In a post-credits scene we see Rin, still alive, waking up and hugging Kuroneko's black cat doll.

Development
The game was first unofficially unveiled when gameplay footage was leaked onto the internet in October 2008. Hudson reported that the footage was stolen from a PR company's servers. It was later officially revealed in Famitsu in July 2009.

Reception

Calling has received a mostly mixed reception from critics. Based on 28 reviews the game holds a Metacritic score of 49/100, and a 51.40% on GameRankings based on 20 reviews.

References

2009 video games
Fiction about purgatory
Hudson Soft games
Konami games
Psychological horror games
Video games about ghosts
Video games developed in Japan
Wii games
Wii-only games